Douglas James Hawkins (born 5 May 1960) is a former Australian rules footballer who represented  and  in the Australian Football League (AFL). He also enjoyed a brief career in media and ran for the Senate, as a member of Palmer United Party, in the 2013 Australian federal election.

Early career
He got his wish, making his VFL debut for Footscray in 1978 as a teenager.

Football career

Footscray
Hawkins made his debut in Round 1 1978, against the team he grew up barracking for, the North Melbourne Kangaroos, he recorded 7 disposals and a goal. He played 18 games in his debut season, recording 241 disposals and kicking 11 goals for the season. He played all 22 games in his second season and kicked 17 goals. Over the next few years, he began to make a name for himself as one of the finest wingers the game has ever seen, so much so that at the team's home ground, the Western Oval,  the outer wing of the ground was named the "Doug Hawkins Wing".

Hawkins made the VFL team of the year for the first time in the 1984 season, a season in which Hawkins amassed 446 disposals and booted 9 goals for the year. His finest individual season came in 1985, winning the Charles Sutton Medal, his first and only best and fairest award of his career. 1985 saw Hawkins rack up 531 disposals and kick 7 goals for the year. He backed up his 1985 season by making the VFL team of the year again in 1986.

Captaincy
Hawkins was named Captain of Footscray at the beginning of the 1990 season, taking over from Stephen Wallis, he captained the club from 1990 to 1993 and Hawkins was played uncharacteristically as a small forward, as opposed to the wing. He kicked 38 goals in 1991 to win the club goalkicking and followed it up in 1992 with 42 goals. His final season for Footscray came in 1994, with one of his last game's being a famous one, as he broke Ted Whitten's long-standing club record of 321 for Footscray, and Whitten was on hand to congratulate him.

Fitzroy 
However, after playing 329 games and kicking 216 goals for the Bulldogs, at the conclusion of the 1994 season his contract was not renewed, so he moved to the Fitzroy Football Club for the 1995 season; he played 21 games and kicked 11 goals for the club before announcing his retirement.

Statistics

|- style="background-color: #EAEAEA"
! scope="row" style="text-align:center" | 1978
|style="text-align:center;"|
| 7 || 18 || 11 || 7 || 157 || 84 || 241 || 65 ||  || 0.6 || 0.4 || 8.7 || 4.7 || 13.4 || 3.6 || 
|- 
! scope="row" style="text-align:center" | 1979
|style="text-align:center;"|
| 7 || 22 || 17 || 13 || 279 || 106 || 385 || 64 ||  || 0.8 || 0.6 || 12.7 || 4.8 || 17.5 || 2.9 || 
|- style="background:#eaeaea;"
! scope="row" style="text-align:center" | 1980
|style="text-align:center;"|
| 7 || 12 || 5 || 7 || 138 || 81 || 219 || 38 ||  || 0.4 || 0.6 || 11.5 || 6.8 || 18.3 || 3.2 || 
|- 
! scope="row" style="text-align:center" | 1981
|style="text-align:center;"|
| 7 || 21 || 12 || 11 || 219 || 189 || 408 || 73 ||  || 0.6 || 0.5 || 10.4 || 9.0 || 19.4 || 3.5 || 
|- style="background:#eaeaea;"
! scope="row" style="text-align:center" | 1982
|style="text-align:center;"|
| 7 || 16 || 5 || 5 || 198 || 132 || 330 || 48 ||  || 0.3 || 0.3 || 12.4 || 8.3 || 20.6 || 3.0 || 
|- 
! scope="row" style="text-align:center" | 1983
|style="text-align:center;"|
| 7 || 19 || 6 || 6 || 254 || 179 || 433 || 74 ||  || 0.3 || 0.3 || 13.4 || 9.4 || 22.8 || 3.9 || 
|- style="background:#eaeaea;"
! scope="row" style="text-align:center" | 1984
|style="text-align:center;"|
| 7 || 22 || 9 || 13 || 290 || 156 || 446 || 99 ||  || 0.4 || 0.6 || 13.2 || 7.1 || 20.3 || 4.5 || 
|- 
! scope="row" style="text-align:center" | 1985
|style="text-align:center;"|
| 7 || 24 || 7 || 8 || 349 || 182 || 531 || 172 ||  || 0.3 || 0.3 || 14.5 || 7.6 || 22.1 || 7.2 || 
|- style="background:#eaeaea;"
! scope="row" style="text-align:center" | 1986
|style="text-align:center;"|
| 7 || 16 || 2 || 4 || 198 || 98 || 296 || 92 ||  || 0.1 || 0.3 || 12.4 || 6.1 || 18.5 || 5.8 || 
|- 
! scope="row" style="text-align:center" | 1987
|style="text-align:center;"|
| 7 || 12 || 6 || 2 || 144 || 90 || 234 || 72 || 8 || 0.5 || 0.2 || 12.0 || 7.5 || 19.5 || 6.0 || 0.7
|- style="background:#eaeaea;"
! scope="row" style="text-align:center" | 1988
|style="text-align:center;"|
| 7 || 20 || 7 || 3 || 198 || 161 || 359 || 90 || 22 || 0.4 || 0.2 || 9.9 || 8.1 || 18.0 || 4.5 || 1.1
|- 
! scope="row" style="text-align:center" | 1989
|style="text-align:center;"|
| 7 || 20 || 8 || 4 || 266 || 206 || 472 || 127 || 33 || 0.4 || 0.2 || 13.3 || 10.3 || 23.6 || 6.4 || 1.7
|- style="background:#eaeaea;"
! scope="row" style="text-align:center" | 1990
|style="text-align:center;"|
| 7 || 21 || 28 || 12 || 248 || 145 || 393 || 101 || 16 || 1.3 || 0.6 || 11.8 || 6.9 || 18.7 || 4.8 || 0.8
|- 
! scope="row" style="text-align:center" | 1991
|style="text-align:center;"|
| 7 || 22 || 38 || 33 || 248 || 119 || 367 || 116 || 20 || 1.7 || 1.5 || 11.3 || 5.4 || 16.7 || 5.3 || 0.9
|- style="background:#eaeaea;"
! scope="row" style="text-align:center" | 1992
|style="text-align:center;"|
| 7 || 23 || 42 || 22 || 254 || 155 || 409 || 123 || 26 || 1.8 || 1.0 || 11.0 || 6.7 || 17.8 || 5.3 || 1.1
|- 
! scope="row" style="text-align:center" | 1993
|style="text-align:center;"|
| 7 || 20 || 6 || 11 || 200 || 156 || 356 || 88 || 21 || 0.3 || 0.6 || 10.0 || 7.8 || 17.8 || 4.4 || 1.1
|- style="background:#eaeaea;"
! scope="row" style="text-align:center" | 1994
|style="text-align:center;"|
| 7 || 21 || 7 || 8 || 143 || 88 || 231 || 53 || 23 || 0.3 || 0.4 || 6.8 || 4.2 || 11.0 || 2.5 || 1.1
|- 
! scope="row" style="text-align:center" | 1995
|style="text-align:center;"|
| 3 || 21 || 11 || 3 || 180 || 162 || 342 || 68 || 32 || 0.5 || 0.1 || 8.6 || 7.7 || 16.3 || 3.2 || 1.5
|- class="sortbottom"
! colspan=3| Career
! 350
! 227
! 172
! 3963
! 2489
! 6452
! 1563
! 201
! 0.6
! 0.5
! 11.3
! 7.1
! 18.4
! 4.5
! 1.1
|}

Accolades and Honours
During his playing career, Hawkins won the club best and fairest award in 1985, represented Victoria five times, and was named in the AFL Team of the Year in 1984 and 1986. Upon reaching 300 senior games, he was awarded AFL Life Membership in 1993. 
After retiring, Hawkins was awarded Father of the Year in 1998 and was one of the torch bearers for the 2000 Olympic Games. When the Bulldogs' Team of the Century was announced in 2002, Hawkins was named on the wing as vice-captain. In 2004, he was inducted into the AFL Hall of Fame. In 2010, he was inducted into the Western Bulldogs Hall of Fame before being upgraded to Club Legend status in 2014.

Media career
Off the field, Hawkins was known as an old-fashioned Aussie larrikin, someone who himself acknowledged he was not one of the smartest people going around, but was always up for a laugh. As a panel member of the Nine Network's The Footy Show during the mid-1990s, he was often portrayed as the show's court jester. In 1998, Hawkins moved to the Seven Network and appeared on a Wednesday night rival to The Footy Show, Live and Kicking.

Politics
Hawkins stood as a candidate for a Victorian Senate seat in the 2013 Australian Federal Election as a member of Palmer United Party.

Personal life
Hawkins is married to Raelene, who appeared on Fox Footy's Living with Footballers before it was axed at the end of 2004. They have three children – a son and two daughters. Doug currently resides near Bacchus Marsh and has served as a coach of the Bacchus Marsh Football Club.

References

Bibliography

External links
 
 AFL: Hall of Fame

Australian Football Hall of Fame inductees
Australian rules football commentators
Australian television personalities
1960 births
Living people
Australian rules footballers from Victoria (Australia)
Western Bulldogs players
Fitzroy Football Club players
Charles Sutton Medal winners
People from Bacchus Marsh
United Australia Party (2013) politicians
Braybrook Football Club players
Victorian State of Origin players
People from Braybrook, Victoria